Palace of Gold is the ninth studio album by the Canadian country rock band Blue Rodeo. It is the band's first album with guitarist Bob Egan, formerly of Freakwater and Wilco, and is notable for performances featuring the Bushwhack Horns.

Track listing
All songs by Greg Keelor and Jim Cuddy, except where noted.

"Palace of Gold" – 3:47
"Holding On" – 3:56
"Homeward Bound Angel" – 5:47
"Bulletproof" – 4:43
"Comet" – 3:43
"Walk Like You Don't Mind" – 4:09
"Love Never Lies" – 3:27
"Stage Door" – 3:01
"Cause for Sympathy" – 4:11
"What a Surprise" – 3:33
"Clearer View" – 2:41
"Glad to Be Alive" – 3:20
"Find a Way to Say Goodbye" – 4:20
"Tell Me Baby" – 5:02
"The Railroad" (Lee Hazlewood) (Live – US edition only) – 4:19
"Bad Timing" (Live – US edition only) – 6:07
"You're Everywhere" (Live – US edition only) – 3:40

The title track was later covered by the Toronto surf-country band The Sadies under the title of "The Story's Often Told". The Sadies' album on which the track appears was produced by Blue Rodeo's singer/guitarist, Greg Keelor.

The singer/guitarist, Jim Cuddy, said in concert that "Bulletproof", the album's first single, was his attempt to emulate the songwriting of his admired singer-songwriter Ron Sexsmith. He originally wrote the song to give to Blue Rodeo's bass guitarist, Bazil Donovan, for use in a solo project, but chose in the end to keep the song for Blue Rodeo.

"Glad to Be Alive" was later re-recorded for Blue Rodeo's 2014 Christmas album, A Merrie Christmas to You.

"Clearer View" was later re-recorded for Jim Cuddy's 2019 solo album, Countrywide Soul.

Charts

Weekly charts

Year-end charts

Certifications

References

2002 albums
Blue Rodeo albums